Computational social science is the academic sub-discipline concerned with computational approaches to the social sciences. This means that computers are used to model, simulate, and analyze social phenomena.  Fields include computational economics, computational sociology, cliodynamics, culturomics,  and the automated analysis of contents, in social and traditional media. It focuses on investigating social and behavioral relationships and interactions through social simulation, modeling, network analysis, and media analysis.

Definitions 
There are two terminologies that relate to each other: Social Science Computing (SSC) and Computational Social Science (CSS). In literature, CSS is referred to the field of social science that uses the computational approaches in studying the social phenomena.
On the other hand, SSC is the field in which computational methodologies are created to assist in explanations of social phenomena.

Computational social science revolutionizes both fundamental legs of the scientific method: empirical research, especially through big data, by analyzing the digital footprint left behind through social online activities; and scientific theory, especially through computer simulation model building through social simulation. It is a multi-disciplinary and integrated approach to social survey focusing on information processing by means of advanced information technology. The computational tasks include the analysis of social networks, social geographic systems, social media content and traditional media content.

Computational social science work increasingly relies on the greater availability of large databases, currently constructed and maintained by a number of interdisciplinary projects, including: 
 The Seshat: Global History Databank, which systematically collects state-of-the-art accounts of the political and social organization of human groups and how societies have evolved through time into an authoritative databank. Seshat is affiliated also with the Evolution Institute, a non-profit think-tank that "uses evolutionary science to solve real-world problems."
 D-PLACE: the Database of Places, Languages, Culture and Environment, which provides data on over 1,400 human social formations
 The Atlas of Cultural Evolution , an archaeological database created by Peter N. Peregrine
 CHIA: The Collaborative Information for Historical Analysis, a multidisciplinary collaborative endeavor hosted by the University of Pittsburgh with the goal of archiving historical information and linking data as well as academic/research institutions around the globe
 International Institute of Social History, which collects data on the global social history of labour relations, workers, and labour
 Human Relations Area Files eHRAF Archaeology
 Human Relations Area Files eHRAF World Cultures
Clio-Infra a database of measures of economic performance and other aspects of societal well-being on a global sample of societies from 1800 CE to the present
 The Google Ngram Viewer, an online search engine that charts frequencies of sets of comma-delimited search strings using a yearly count of n-grams as found in the largest online body of human knowledge, the Google Books corpus.

The analysis of vast quantities of historical newspaper and book content have been pioneered in 2017, while other studies on similar data showed how periodic structures can be automatically discovered in historical newspapers. A similar analysis was performed on social media, again revealing strongly periodic structures.

See also
 Cliodynamics
 Computational cognition
 Computational politics
 Computational sociology
 Digital humanities
 Digital sociology
 Online content analysis
 Predictive analytics
 Seshat (project)
 Social informatics
 Social web
 Social network analysis

References

External links 
 ESSA: European Social Simulation Association portal
 PAAA: Pan-Asian Association for Agent-based Approach in Social Systems Sciences
 CSSSA: Computational Social Science Society of the Americas
 2022 International Conference on Computational Social Science
  "Life in the network: the coming age of computational social science". Retrieved June 10, 2015.
 Seshat

 
Social sciences
Computational science
Computational fields of study